This is a list of airports in Kuwait, sorted by location.



Airports 

Airport names shown in bold indicate the airport has scheduled service on commercial airlines.

See also 
 Transport in Kuwait
 List of airports by ICAO code: O#OK - Kuwait
 Wikipedia:WikiProject Aviation/Airline destination lists: Asia#Kuwait

References 
 
  – includes IATA codes
 Great Circle Mapper: Airports in Kuwait – IATA and ICAO codes, coordinates
 World Aero Data: Kuwait – ICAO codes and coordinates

External links 

Kuwait
 
Airports
Airports
Kuwait